The 1982 Spillers Greyhound Derby took place during May and June with the final being held on 26 June 1982 at White City Stadium. The winner was Lauries Panther and the winning owner Laurie James received £25,000. The competition was sponsored by the Spillers for the final time.

Final result 
At White City (over 500 metres):

Distances 
½, head, 1, ½, dis (lengths)
The distances between the greyhounds are in finishing order and shown in lengths. One length is equal to 0.08 of one second.

Competition Report
Parkdown Jet returned in an attempt to defend his title and claim a third consecutive win for Ireland. The British challenge was led by a record £50,000 purchase called Long Spell bought by turkey farmers Ray and Eddie Turner from Irish Breeder Pat Dalton. Ante-post favourite Brief Candle from the Midlands kennels of Paddy Hancox and Laurels champion Lauries Panther were two other leading contenders.

In a qualifying round Lauries Panther defeated Night Miller and set a new track record with 27.72 sec. Supreme Tiger and Fearless Mover went fastest in the first round held on two separate nights but both Brief Candle and Long Spell were eliminated. Geoff De Mulder's Fearless Mover went fastest again in the second round whilst Parkdown Jet and Lauries Panther both remained unbeaten. During the quarter-finals Parkdown Jet qualified by just missing a first bend incident and Lauries Panther won another crowded race that resulted in Fearless Mover and 1981 English Greyhound Derby finalist Clohast Flame both being eliminated.
 
The first semifinal resulted in a very unusual situation after a dead-heat for third place, and it was left to a toss of a coin to determine who made the final. Luck was with Pineapple Barrow and not Jims Memory (trained by Louis Solomon) who had to be content with standing as reserve for the final. The race had been won by Lauries Panther who still remained unbeaten from Duke of Hazard. The second semi was won by Puppy Derby champion Special Account from Supreme Tiger and Killimy Ivy in a race that saw the defending champion Parkdown Jet finish lame.

In the final Supreme Tiger made the best start but was pursued by Lauries Panther at the first bend who then bumped and knocked over Killimy Ivy with Special Account hampered in the process. Supreme Tiger led until the third bend when Lauries Panther then took the lead and held off a strong finishes by Special Account and Duke of Hazard. Laurie James from Romford had turned down an offer of £70,000 on the day of the final for Lauries Panther.

Quarter-finals

Semifinals

+ Final qualifying place decided by toss of coin

See also
1982 UK & Ireland Greyhound Racing Year

References

Greyhound Derby
English Greyhound Derby
English Greyhound Derby
English Greyhound Derby
English Greyhound Derby